Neerdar may refer to:

 Neerdar, Willingen, a district of Willingen, a community in Hesse, Germany
 Neerdar (Wilde Aa), a river of Hesse, Germany, tributary of the Wilde Aa